Rex Elvie Allen Jr. (born August 23, 1947) is an American country music singer. He is the son of Rex Allen.

Early life
Allen was born in Chicago, Illinois, United States, the son of Rex Allen.

Career
Singing in the "countrypolitan" style, he had hits with "Goodbye" (1974), "I'm Gettin Good at Missing You (Solitaire)" (1977), "Lonely Street" (1977), "Two Less Lonely People" (1977), "With Love" (1978), "If I Fell in Love With You" (1979), "It's Over" (1980), "Drink it Down, Lady" (1980), "Cup of Tea" (1980, a duet with Margo Smith) and others. He is also the composer and performer of the alternate state anthem of Arizona, entitled "Arizona".

Allen was a regular on The Statler Brothers Show on TNN in the 1990s, and he hosted the spin-off series, Yesteryear.

Discography

Studio albums

Compilation albums

Singles

Notes

A ^ "Goodbye" also peaked at number 34 on the U.S. Adult Contemporary chart.
B ^ "Can You Hear Those Pioneers" also peaked at number 100 on the Canadian RPM Top Singles chart.

References

External links
Rex Allen Jr. official website
Rex Allen Jr. – noted alternate state anthem
2008 Western Music Hall of Fame inductee

1947 births
Living people
Singers from Chicago
American country singer-songwriters
Country musicians from Illinois
Western music (North America)
Singer-songwriters from Illinois